Nettie Pettway Young (1916–2010) was an American artist. She is associated with the Gee's Bend quilting collective and was an assistant manager of the Freedom Quilting Bee. Her work has been exhibited at the Museum of Fine Arts, Houston and the Frist Art Museum, and is included in the collections of the Philadelphia Museum of Art and the Nasher Museum of Art.

Life 
Nettie Pettway Young's paternal grandfather and father were enslaved in Alberta, Alabama. Her grandfather was born to the Irby Plantation, but was sold to the Pettway Plantation. There he raised Nettie's father. Thus, his last name was Pettway until he gained his freedom when he was an adult and moved to the Young Plantation to sharecrop. Nettie was raised on the Young Plantation after sharecropping when her father and her step-mother, Deborah Pettway Young, rented land from the Young Plantation. 

Nettie married Clint Young and together they bought a house from their landlord, the Wilkinson family. It was an original 1930's "project house," which they later received an FHA loan to afford. Nettie lived in that house and tended to the surrounding land until she died.

Work 
Young worked with a keen intuition for construction that she learned from her step-mother, Deborah Pettway Young. She made all of her children's clothes and did not use patterns for sewing clothes or quilts. When she joined the Freedom Quilting Bee, she began to use patterns common among her peers, and this, she said, stifled her creativity. "It broke the ideas I had in my head. I should have stayed with my own ideas."

References 

1916 births
2010 deaths
Quilters